Jean Servais Stas (21 August 1813 – 13 December 1891) was a Belgian analytical chemist who co-discovered the atomic weight of carbon.

Life and work 

Stas was born in Leuven and trained initially as a physician. He later switched to chemistry and worked at the École Polytechnique in Paris under the direction of Jean-Baptiste Dumas. Stas and Dumas established the atomic weight of carbon by weighing a sample of the pure material, burning it in pure oxygen, and then weighing the carbon dioxide produced.

In 1840, Stas was appointed professor at the Royal Military School in Brussels. He acquired international fame by determining the atomic weights of the elements more accurately than had ever been done before, using an atomic mass of 16 for oxygen as his standard. His results disproved the hypothesis of the English physicist William Prout that all atomic weights must be integer multiples of that of hydrogen. These careful, accurate atomic weight measurements of Stas helped lay the foundation for the periodic system of elements of Dmitri Mendeleev and others.

Following the pioneering work of Lavoisier and his statement of the conservation of mass, the prolonged and exhaustive experiments of Stas supported the strict accuracy of this law in chemical reactions, even though they were carried out with other intentions. His research  indicated that in certain reactions the loss or gain could not have been more than from 2 to 4 parts in 100,000. The difference in the accuracy aimed at and attained by Lavoisier on the one hand, and by Morley and Stas on the other, is enormous.

In 1850, Stas gave the evidence that the Belgian Count Hippolyte Visart de Bocarmé killed his brother-in-law by poisoning him with nicotine.

Stas retired in 1869 because of problems with his voice caused by a throat ailment. He became commissioner of the mint, but resigned in 1872 because he disagreed with the government's monetary policy. Jean Stas died in Brussels and was buried at Leuven.

Honors and awards 

 Foreign Member, Royal Society of London (1879)
 Davy Medal (1885)
 

On May 5, 1891 an event was held recognizing the 50th anniversary of Jean Servais Stas' membership in the Royal Academy of Belgium. Various presenters spoke about his significant scientific contributions. He was presented with a medal in his honor sculpted by Belgian engraver Alphonse Michaux and with an album containing accolades authored by scientific societies from around the world.

Selected writings

 
 
 
 Stas, Jean Servais (1865). Nouvelles recherches sur les lois des proportions chimiques : sur les poids atomiques et leurs rapports mutuels. Brussels: Bruxelles. M. Hayez

See also 
 Theodore William Richards
 Law of reciprocal proportions
 Mass spectrometry
 Toxicology

Further reading 
 
 - translated into English by Ralph Oesper

References 

1813 births
1891 deaths
Belgian chemists
Scientists from Leuven
Foreign Members of the Royal Society
Foreign associates of the National Academy of Sciences
Belgian toxicologists
Academic staff of the Royal Military Academy (Belgium)